Journal of Iberian Geology (formerly Cuadernos de Geología Ibérica) is a triannual peer-reviewed scientific journal published by the Universidad Complutense de Madrid. The journal covers the field of geology and related earth sciences, primarily on issues that are relevant to the geology of the Iberian Peninsula.

External links 
 

Geology journals
Geology of Spain
Geology of Portugal
Publications established in 1970
Multilingual journals
Open access journals
Triannual journals
Academic journals associated with universities and colleges